Alo, Da! (Bulgarian: Ало, Да!, meaning "Hello, Yes?") is a Bulgarian mobile virtual network operator, operated by the Trud and 24 Chasa newspapers. The company advertises itself as offering free access to the mobile webpages of the two newspapers.
 Official website

Mobile virtual network operators